Macarena Oz (born in Mexico City, Mexico) is a Mexican actress, best known for her role Roxana Pérez in the Telemundo's telenovela Los miserables (2014), and more recently as Lisette Bernal in the Televisa's drama series La usurpadora (2019), reboot based on the 1998 Mexican telenovela of the same name. She studied acting at the Televisa Children's Art Education Center during 2010 to 2012.

Filmography

References

External links 
 

Living people
People from Mexico City
People educated at Centro de Estudios y Formación Actoral
Year of birth missing (living people)
21st-century Mexican actresses
Mexican telenovela actresses